The 2017 Puerto Rico FC season was the club's second season and first full season of existence. The club played in the North American Soccer League, the second tier of the American soccer pyramid.

Season review
On January 23, the team announced the return of five regulars from the 2016 starting XI as well as a young prospect. Returning players were Trevor Spangenberg, Rudy Dawson, Cristiano Dias, Ramón Soria, Kyle Culbertson, and young goalkeeper Austin Pack.

On January 24, the team again announced the resigning of Michael Kafari, Tyler Rudy, Brian Bement, and Sidney Rivera for another run. The team also stated Bljedi Bardic will not return to the team as he has decided to stay in New York and take advantage of other career opportunities.

On January 26, CONCACAF announced PRFC will host group D in the 2017 CFU Club Championship at Juan Ramón Loubriel Stadium starting March 14. The club also announced the resigning of the three Puerto Rican footballers on the team for another season; Hector Ramos, Jorge Rivera, Joseph Marrero.

On January 30, the team announced two new signings for the 2017 season: Conor Doyle who last played for Colorado Rapids before being loaned to Colorado Springs Switchbacks in 2016, and Yuma who last played for Rayo OKC in 2016.

On February 10, the club announced the preparation for the 2017 NASL Season, as well as the Caribbean Club Championship, Puerto Rico FC will take part in the 7th Annual Bayamón City Cup which begins February 10 at the Bayamón Soccer Complex.

On March 2, the team announced 2 new additions to the team in defender Jake Stovall and goalkeeper Billy Thompson prior to the start of the CFU games.

On April 28, 4 weeks into the NASL spring season. Puerto Rico FC announced the signing of defender Phanuel Kavita, who spent the 2016 season with Real Salt Lake of Major League Soccer.

On July 15, Puerto Rico ended the Spring season in eighth place with nine points. Finishing out with a 1-6-9 record.

On July 25, the team announced a new signing of Spanish veteran attacking midfielder Mario, prior to the start of the Fall season.

On October 1, PRFC took to the field for the first time since the devastation on Hurricane Maria against the Cosmos in MCU Park.

Roster

Transfers

In

Out

On loan

Preseason

2017 Bayamón Cup

Friendlies

Competitions

CFU Club Championship

Group stage

NASL Spring season

Standings

Results summary

Results by round

Matches

NASL Fall season

Standings

Results summary

Results by round

Matches

Squad statistics

Appearances and goals
 

|-
|colspan="14"|Players who left Puerto Rico during the season:
|-
|}

Top scorers

Disciplinary record
Needs to be updated.

References 

Puerto Rico FC
American soccer clubs 2017 season
2017 North American Soccer League season
2017 in Puerto Rican football